Eastern Indian Tribal Union (EITU) was a regional political party in Mizoram, India founded in 1955. 

The party is now defunct.

References

Political parties in Mizoram
1955 establishments in Assam
Political parties established in 1955
Political parties with year of disestablishment missing